Paired mesoderm homeobox protein 2A is a protein that in humans is encoded by the PHOX2A gene.

Function 

The protein encoded by this gene contains a paired-like homeodomain most similar to that of the Drosophila aristaless gene product. This protein is expressed specifically in noradrenergic cell types. It regulates the expression of tyrosine hydroxylase and dopamine beta-hydroxylase, two catecholaminergic biosynthetic enzymes essential for the differentiation and maintenance of noradrenergic phenotype. Mutations in this gene have been associated with autosomal recessive congenital fibrosis of the extraocular muscles (CFEOM2).

Interactions 

PHOX2A has been shown to interact with HAND2.

References

Further reading

External links 
 Engle Laboratory CFEOM page
  GeneReviews/NCBI/NIH/UW entry on Congenital Fibrosis of the Extraocular Muscles
  OMIM entries on Congenital Fibrosis of the Extraocular Muscles
 

Transcription factors